Jawahar Navodaya Vidyalaya, Birbhum or locally called as JNV Gopalpur is a boarding, co-educational  school in Birbhum district of West Bengal in India. Navodaya Vidyalayas are funded by the Indian Ministry of Human Resources Development and administered by Navodaya Vidyalaya Samiti, an autonomous body under the ministry.

History 
The school was founded in 2005 and is a part of Jawahar Navodaya Vidyalaya schools. This school is administered and monitored by Patna regional office of Navodaya Vidyalaya Samiti.

Affiliations 
JNV Birbhum is affiliated to Central Board of Secondary Education with affiliation number 2440015.

See also 

 List of JNV schools

References

External links 

 Official Website of JNV Birbhum

Boarding schools in West Bengal
High schools and secondary schools in West Bengal
Birbhum
Schools in Birbhum district
Educational institutions established in 2005
2005 establishments in West Bengal